Identikit (also known as The Driver's Seat) is a 1974 Italian drama film directed by Giuseppe Patroni Griffi. Based on the 1970 novella The Driver's Seat by Muriel Spark, it is a psychological drama starring Elizabeth Taylor and Ian Bannen, and featuring Andy Warhol.

Plot

Lise, a mentally unbalanced middle-aged woman, travels from her home in Hamburg, Germany to Rome, Italy where she embarks on a fatal destiny that she had helped to arrange for herself – a premeditated search for someone, anyone, with whom she could form a dangerous liaison. Lise meets a variety of people during her journey and stay in Rome who include Bill, a lecherous British businessman that she meets on the plane to Rome who tries to seduce her; Carlo, a young man whom Lise tries to know more about; an elderly Englishwoman named Mrs. Fiedke whom Lise bonds with to go shopping; and Pierre, a Frenchman who picks up Lise hoping to seduce her as well.

The film is told in a non-linear narrative as throughout the film are scenes of the local Rome police interviewing all the people that Lise interacted with as well as investigating the reasons for her strange behavior that led up to her own murder.

Cast
 Elizabeth Taylor as Lise
 Ian Bannen as Bill
 Guido Mannari as Carlo
 Mona Washbourne as Mrs. Helen Fiedke
 Luigi Squarzina as Lead Detective
 Maxence Mailfort as Pierre
 Andy Warhol (uncredited) as English Lord
 Anita Bartolucci as Saleswoman
 Gino Giuseppe as Police Commissioner

External links

Copy of short note from Elizabeth Taylor to Muriel Spark about the role of Lise (National Library of Scotland archive)

1974 films
1974 drama films
English-language Italian films
1970s Italian-language films
Films based on British novels
Films directed by Giuseppe Patroni Griffi
Films set in Rome
1970s Italian films